Children's Hospital & Medical Center is a non-profit regional pediatric specialty health care center located in Omaha, Nebraska. The 145-bed hospital is the only free-standing children's hospital in Nebraska and serves patients from throughout its home state, western Iowa, South Dakota, northern Kansas and northwestern Missouri. The hospital provides more than 30 pediatric specialty clinics for a variety of specialized needs including asthma, cardiology, neurology, pediatric cancer, neonatal intensive care follow-up, diabetes, and physical, occupational, and speech therapies. The hospital also offers the Carolyn Scott Rainbow House, a home-away-from-home for families of patients.

History 
Children's Hospital & Medical Center opened as Children's Memorial Hospital on March 14, 1948. The institution was founded by Dr. C.W.M. Poynter, dean of the University of Nebraska Medical Center, and Henry Doorly, publisher of the Omaha World-Herald. The men shared a vision that no child in need of medical care would be turned away due to an inability to pay. Shortly after opening, a polio epidemic engulfed the nation and the region.

The first facility was built at 42nd and Dewey in Midtown Omaha at the cost of $850,000. Funded by a community-wide penny drive, more than 30,000 people in Nebraska and western Iowa made additional contributions, as well. The hospital moved to the corner of 83rd and Dodge Street in 1981, and nineteen years later, in 2000, the hospital moved to a state-of-the-art facility at 8200 Dodge Street, across the road from its previous location. An expansion effort to address a growing need for pediatric specialty outpatient care culminated in the opening of the Children's Specialty Pediatric Center, adjacent to the main hospital building, in 2010.

Awards 
The Children's Hospital & Medical Center in Omaha, Nebraska has been recognized as one of the leading pediatric hospitals and has been awarded the 2019 Women's Choice Award for Best Children's Hospitals.

See also 
 Hospitals in Omaha, Nebraska

References

 Limprecht, H.J. (1973) A Chance To Live: The Story of Children's Memorial Hospital of Omaha; Omaha, Nebraska; Children's Memorial Hospital.

External links
 Children's Hospital & Medical Center official website.

Hospital buildings completed in 1948
Hospital buildings completed in 1981
Hospital buildings completed in 2000
Hospitals in Omaha, Nebraska
Children's hospitals in the United States
Pediatric trauma centers